The flattened musk turtle (Sternotherus depressus) is a  critically endangered species of freshwater turtle in the family Kinosternidae. The species is endemic to the southern United States.

Geographic range
S. depressus is an endemic with a restricted range, historically inhabiting the Black Warrior River drainage of north central Alabama. Serious declines have been observed throughout its range, and it has likely been extirpated from greater than 70% of its historic range, especially in much of the Mulberry Fork and the Locust Fork of the upper Black Warrior River Basin. Sipsey Fork populations have fared significantly better due to protection offered by the Bankhead National Forest.

Description
Both the common name and specific name refer to the fact that the species' carapace (upper shell) is much lower and flatter than those of the other members of the genus Sternotherus. In fact the flattened musk turtle looks as if someone had accidentally stepped on it, hence the common name.

Captivity
Individuals of S. depressus have survived for more than 20 years in captivity. Although reproductive rates are low for the species, S. depressus has been bred infrequently in captivity with relative success. Future propagation efforts may be key to preserving and reintroducing the species once its habitat has been restored.

Threats and causes of decline
Erosion and siltation from extensive strip mining for coal and damming have been the leading causes of decline in the flattened musk turtle, with clear cutting, development, and pollution also playing significant roles in habitat degradation throughout its historic range. As historically rock and bedrock bottom creeks have turned to mud and sand bottom creeks due to erosion, S. depressus has lost the rock crevices it relies on to escape predation and the high stream flow rates that characterize the streams it inhabits.

References

Further reading
Behler JL, King FW (1979). The Audubon Society Field Guide to North American Reptiles and Amphibians. New York: Alfred A. Knopf. 743 pp., 657 color plates. . (Sternotherus depressus, p. 443 + Plate 316).
Powell R, Conant R, Collins JT (2016). Peterson Field Guide to Reptiles and Amphibians of Eastern and Central North America, Fourth Edition. Boston and New York: Houghton Mifflin Harcourt. xiv + 494 pp., 47 plates, 207 figures. . (Sternotherus depressus, pp. 227–228 + Plate 19).
Smith HM, Brodie ED Jr (1982). Reptiles of North America: A Guide to Field Identification. New York: Golden Press. 240 pp.  (paperback),  (hardcover). (Sternotherus depressus, pp. 28–29).
Tinkle DW, Webb RG (1955). "A New Species of Sternotherus with a Discussion of the Sternotherus carinatus Complex". Tulane Studies in Zoology 3 (3): 53–67. (Stenotherus depressus, new species).

External links
Tortoise & Freshwater Turtle Specialist Group (1996). Sternotherus depressus.   2006 IUCN Red List of Threatened Species. Downloaded on 29 July 2007.

Reptiles of the United States
Sternotherus
Endemic fauna of Alabama
Reptiles described in 1955
Taxa named by Robert G. Webb
Taxonomy articles created by Polbot